İlayda Çevik (born 22 December 1994) is a Turkish actress. She is best known for playing Maya in the television series, Karagül. Çevik was born in Balikesir.

Cevik's first theater performance was a children's play called Children's Playground and she made her feature film debut in the film in 2015 with the film Kızım İçin, which starred Yetkin Dikinciler, Eda Ece, İnci Türkay and Berke Üzrek.

Filmography 
Television

Films

Music videos

References

External links

1994 births
Living people
People from Balıkesir
Turkish film actresses
Turkish television actresses
Actresses from Istanbul
21st-century Turkish actresses